Christina M. Wilson (born January 15, 1979) is an American chef and reality television personality. She was the winner of season 10 of the FOX Network's reality cooking show Hell's Kitchen. She was awarded the position of chef de cuisine at Gordon Ramsay Steak at the Paris Las Vegas. After 2015, she was the Corporate Executive Chef of Gordon Ramsay Restaurant Group. In 2016 and from 2018 onward, she has also returned to Hell's Kitchen as a Sous-chef. Since 2020, she has been the VP Culinary of Gordon Ramsay North America.

Early life and family

Wilson is from Phillipsburg, New Jersey and in 1997 graduated from Phillipsburg High School, where she played field hockey, basketball and softball. She has three brothers and was inspired to cook by her grandmother. Wilson is openly lesbian.

Wilson earned a basketball scholarship to West Chester University in Pennsylvania but lost the scholarship and waited tables to pay tuition. She transferred to Temple University, graduating with a B.A. in English and Language Arts in 2007.

Career
Wilson never attended culinary school, but instead got her start working at McDonald's. She cites her first real cooking experience as a job at West Chester Country Club in West Chester, Pennsylvania where she "begged to be allowed in the kitchen to learn." While attending Temple University in Philadelphia, she began working in city restaurants. Prior to her win on Hell's Kitchen in 2012, she was chef de cuisine at Mercato BYOB in Philadelphia. She underwent a six-week training course to prepare for her job at Gordon Ramsay Steak in Las Vegas.

In 2015, Wilson oversaw the U.S. division of the Gordon Ramsay Restaurant Group as Culinary Director, which comprised 10 restaurants at the time.

Since October 2020, Wilson has been the Vice President of Culinary for Gordon Ramsay North America; in addition to the 14 locations that Ramsay has in the United States at this time, Gordon Ramsay North America's CEO, Norman Abdallah, has signaled the company's intention to open 75 new company-owned locations across the United States between 2022 and 2026.

She has made an appearance on every subsequent Hell’s Kitchen season following her initial run, being the red team Sous-chef on seasons 15, 17, 18, 19, 20 and 21. She also made a few appearances on Gordon Ramsay's 24 Hours to Hell and Back, The F Word, and MasterChef Junior. Additionally, in 2017 Wilson hosted a ten-episode YouTube series titled Recipes From Hell's Kitchen.

See also
 List of restaurants owned or operated by Gordon Ramsay

References

External links 
 
 

1979 births
Living people
American women chefs
Reality cooking competition winners
People from Phillipsburg, New Jersey
Participants in American reality television series
Temple University alumni
LGBT people from New Jersey
West Chester University alumni
West Chester Golden Rams athletes
Phillipsburg High School (New Jersey) alumni
Chefs from New Jersey
21st-century American LGBT people
21st-century American women
Hell's Kitchen (American TV series)
American lesbians
LGBT chefs